Juan Carlos Arguedas Ávila (born 3 May 1970) is a retired Costa Rican footballer.

Club career
Arguedas used to play for AD Carmelita, but was also part of the three "big teams" of Costa Rica's football, Deportivo Saprissa, Herediano and Alajuelense. He made his professional debut for the latter on 18 March 1988 against Ramonense. He was Costa Rica's league top goalscorer twice, in 1994/95 and 1999/2000 with 28 and 23 goals respectively and scored a total of 125 goals in Costa Rica's Premier Division .

Spells abroad
He also had a spell with Tecos in the Primera División de México, in the Guatemalan top division with Cobán Imperial and Aurora and with Colombian side Atlético Bucaramanga. He also had a short stint with Virginia Beach Mariners.

He announced his retirement in May 2004.

International career
He played for Costa Rica at the 1989 FIFA World Youth Championship in Saudi Arabia.

He made his senior debut for Costa Rica in a May 1991 friendly match against Uruguay and earned a total of 24 caps, scoring 4 goals. He has represented his country in 4 FIFA World Cup qualification matches and played at the 1993 UNCAF Nations Cup as well as the 1991 CONCACAF Gold Cup.

He played his final international game in September 2000 against Barbados.

International goals
Scores and results list Costa Rica's goal tally first.

Managerial career
After retiring as a player, Arguedas started managing Carmelita. Later he was appointed manager of San Carlos and Ramonense.

References

External links

1970 births
Living people
Association football midfielders
Costa Rican footballers
Costa Rica under-20 international footballers
Costa Rica international footballers
1991 CONCACAF Gold Cup players
L.D. Alajuelense footballers
Atlético Bucaramanga footballers
Tecos F.C. footballers
Deportivo Saprissa players
Cobán Imperial players
Aurora F.C. players
C.S. Herediano footballers
A.D. Carmelita footballers
Virginia Beach Mariners players
Liga FPD players
Liga MX players
Costa Rican expatriate footballers
Expatriate footballers in Colombia
Expatriate footballers in Mexico
Expatriate footballers in Guatemala
Costa Rican football managers